Khvorshid Kola (also Romanized as Khvorshīd Kolā and Khowrshīd Kolā; also known as Khūzshīd Kolā) is a village in Azadegan Rural District, in the Central District of Galugah County, Mazandaran Province, Iran. At the 2006 census, its population was 2,071, in 554 families.

References 

Populated places in Galugah County